The Dzhugdzhur Mountains or Jugjur Mountains, meaning 'big bulge' in Evenki,  are a mountain range along the western shores of the Sea of Okhotsk in the far east of Siberia.

The mountains are quite deserted, the one exception being the gold mines that have operated in the range since the 1920s.

Geography
To the east the range is bound by the northwest coast of the Sea of Okhotsk. To the northwest the range limits with the Yudoma-Maya Highlands, to the southwest with the Stanovoy Range, to the south with the Dzhagdy Range and to the northeast with the Kolyma Mountains.

Geology
The range was formed by an asymmetrical fold. The southwestern half of the mountains is composed of gneiss and granite from the Precambrian, while the northeast contains Mesozoic shale and limestone as well as Cretaceous and Paleocene igneous rock.

Ecology and Climate
The coastal stretch of the range is populated by Japanese stone pine and Dahurian larch. Parts of the range occupied by the Okhotsk-Manchurian taiga ecoregion contain swathes of Jezo spruce up to elevations of 1,300 m. 

The climate is wet and cold, with wet rainy summers and severe winters.

Popular culture

 "Mikhail", (also known as "Misha") most commonly known as Heavy Weapons Guy or The Heavy, from the 2007 FPS video game Team Fortress 2 lives in a remote log mansion in the Dzhugdzhur Mountains with his mother and three sisters.

References

Landforms of the Russian Far East
Mountain ranges of Khabarovsk Krai
East Siberian Mountains